Stepanos Asoghik, also known as Stepanos Taronetsi, was an Armenian historian of the 11th century. His dates are unknown but he came from Taron and earned the nickname Asoghik ("teller of stories"). He wrote a Universal History in three books. The first two books summarise the history of the world - with particular reference to Armenia - using the Bible, Eusebius of Caesarea, Moses of Khoren and others as sources. The third book deals with the history of the century leading up to Asoghik's own time in a rather disconnected fashion.

Translations

Степанос Таронеци-Асохик (Asoghik, Stepanos T., 10th - 11th c.). Всеобщая история Степаноса Таронского - Асохика по прoзванию, писателя ХІ столетия. Перевод с армянскoго и объяснения Н.Эминым. Москва, Типография Лазаревского института восточных языков. 1864. XVIII, 335 стр.
Asoghik (Stepanos de Taron). L'histoire universelle, Paris, 1859.

11th-century Armenian historians